William C. Lovering Colony State Hospital was a state mental hospital located in Taunton, Massachusetts. It acted as a female sub-hospital of Taunton State Hospital. It is named after former United States Congressman William C. Lovering.

See also 
 List of defunct Massachusetts State Mental Facilities

References

External links
Map which shows the existence of the site 
Map from Mapcarta

Psychiatric hospitals in Massachusetts
Buildings and structures in Bristol County, Massachusetts
Taunton, Massachusetts